Terellia tristicta is a species of tephritid or fruit flies in the genus Terellia of the family Tephritidae.

Distribution
Iran.

References

Tephritinae
Insects described in 1956
Diptera of Asia